Miss Stone may refer to:
 Miss Stone Affair, the kidnapping of American Protestant missionary Ellen Maria Stone
 Miss Stone (film), a 1958 Yugoslav historical film about the Miss Stone Affair